Jorge Resurrección Merodio (born 8 January 1992), known as Koke, is a Spanish professional footballer who plays as a midfielder for La Liga club Atlético Madrid, whom he captains, and for the Spain national team.

He has spent the entirety of his career with Atlético Madrid since making his debut with the first team in 2009, playing a club record of over 550 competitive matches and winning the 2013–14 and 2020–21 La Liga, two Europa League titles and two UEFA Super Cup trophies, while he was also a Champions League runner-up in 2014 and 2016.

Koke won the 2013 European Championship with the Spain under-21 team. He also made his debut for the full side that year, and represented the country at three World Cups and two European Championships.

Club career
Koke was born in Madrid. Having arrived at Atlético Madrid's youth system at the age of eight, he made his debut for the first team on 19 September 2009, playing in the second half of a 5–2 away loss against FC Barcelona after coming on as a substitute for Paulo Assunção. He made three further appearances during the season.

Koke scored his first league goal for Atlético against Sevilla FC on 26 February 2011, his 47th-minute header from a Diego Forlán cross made it 1–1 in an eventual 2–2 home draw. He finished his first full season as a professional with 17 games and two goals (the other coming in a 2–2 draw at RCD Espanyol), as the Colchoneros finished seventh and qualified for the UEFA Europa League.

Koke was again an important member of Atlético's midfield in 2011–12, under both Gregorio Manzano and his successor Diego Simeone. He scored his first league goal of the campaign on 29 April 2012, opening the score in the 62nd minute of an eventual 2–2 away draw against Real Betis. He appeared in 13 matches during the club's successful Europa League run, including a 90th-minute substitute appearance in the 3–0 defeat of Athletic Bilbao in the final.

Aged only 20/21, Koke started in 38 of his 48 official appearances during 2012–13 and scored three goals – this included 112 minutes of play in the final of the Copa del Rey, won against Real Madrid at the Santiago Bernabéu. He also began to excel at passing, either through set pieces or open play.

On 1 September 2013, Koke scored his first goal of the new season, contributing to a 2–1 away win over Real Sociedad. His performances in October earned him the accolade of La Liga Player of the Month, while Simeone won the equivalent managerial award; on 3 March 2014, he scored to help his team to a 2–2 home draw in the Derbi madrileño against Real Madrid.

On 9 April 2014, Koke scored his first goal in the UEFA Champions League, netting the only goal of a quarter-final against Barcelona to send Atlético to the semi-finals for the first time since 1974. He finished the domestic league season as the player with the second most assists with 14, as Atlético won the league title for the first time in 18 years after drawing 1–1 with Barcelona at Camp Nou in the final matchday; he was a nominee at La Liga Awards at attacking midfielder, losing out to Andrés Iniesta.

On 25 June 2014, Koke signed a new five-year deal with Atlético. He was named player of the match in their Champions League group match at Malmö FF on 4 November, scoring the first goal of a 2–0 win. In a penalty shootout against Bayer 04 Leverkusen in the round of 16, on 18 March of the following year, he had his attempt saved by Bernd Leno, but his team nonetheless advanced.

Koke started 2015–16 slowly, scoring one goal and registering not a single assist by the middle of November. By the middle of April 2016, after a spell of six decisive passes in as many games, he equalled his season's assist record of 12; later that month he surpassed that tally, also moving to first place in the assists chart ahead of Barcelona's Luis Suárez, and was voted Player of the Month for the second time.

On 23 October 2016, Koke was sent off for the first time in his career, for two yellow cards in a 0–1 loss at Sevilla. The following 24 May, he signed a new five-year contract until 2024. Only two months after turning 26, he entered the top 10 appearance makers in Atlético history with his 361st against Deportivo de La Coruña on 1 April 2018.

Koke played his 400th official match for the club on 20 January 2019 – becoming the youngest player to do so in the process, at the age of 27 – scoring once and providing one assist in a 3–0 away defeat of SD Huesca. After Diego Godín's departure in the summer, he became team captain. 

On 23 June 2020, Koke played his 450th game in a 1–0 away win against Levante UD, again the youngest to reach that figure for the club. The following 12 May, as his side neared the league title, he made his 500th appearance in a 2–1 home victory over Real Sociedad, a feat only done before by Adelardo Rodríguez; he broke the former's record on 1 October 2022 in his 554th match, a 2–0 win at Sevilla. 

On 12 February 2023, Koke appeared in his 402nd game in the top division, again surpassing Adelardo, in a 1–0 away defeat of RC Celta de Vigo.

International career

Koke was a member of the Spain under-20 side which reached the quarter-finals at the 2011 FIFA World Cup in Colombia. He missed in the last-16 penalty shootout against South Korea, but his team advanced nonetheless.

Koke featured in the Spanish team at the 2012 Summer Olympics in London, playing all three games as the tournament ended at the group stage for the nation. He also represented the under-21s at the 2013 UEFA European Championship, being named to the team of the tournament as Spain won the competition by beating Italy 4–2 in Jerusalem in the final.

On 14 August 2013, Koke made his debut for the senior team, replacing Santi Cazorla for the final 12 minutes of a 2–0 friendly win in Ecuador. His first competitive appearance for La Furia Roja came on 6 September of that year, as he played the full 90 minutes in a 2014 FIFA World Cup qualifier in Finland that ended with a 2–0 win.

Koke was named in Spain's 30-man provisional squad for the 2014 World Cup, and was also included in the final list for the tournament. On 19 June, he made his debut in the tournament after replacing Xabi Alonso at half-time as the champions trailed 0–2 to Chile at the Maracanã in the second group game, but could not change the scoreline as elimination was confirmed. He started in the final fixture, a 3–0 victory over Australia.

Koke was also selected by manager Julen Lopetegui for the 2018 World Cup in Russia. On 1 July, he was one of two Spanish players to miss his attempt in the round-of-16 shootout against the hosts, a 4–3 loss in Moscow.

After two years without a cap, Koke returned to international duty on 11 November 2020 in a 1–1 friendly draw away to the Netherlands, in which he captained the country for the first time. The following May, he was included in the 24-man squad for Euro 2020.

Style of play
Koke is right-footed, but his versatility allows him to play as right, left or central midfielder. He is also known for his passing, and ability to create attacking opportunities.

Koke earned the plaudits of his peers, including Barcelona's Xavi who regarded him as his successor:
He has everything: talent, physical ability, he is a footballer of the present and the future... He has been marked out as the conductor of Spain's orchestra for the next 10 years. I have a special affection for him because we play in the same position and I think he is an extraordinary player.

Career statistics

Club

International

Honours
Atlético Madrid
La Liga: 2013–14, 2020–21
Copa del Rey: 2012–13
Supercopa de España: 2014; runner-up 2013, 2019–20
UEFA Europa League: 2011–12, 2017–18
UEFA Super Cup: 2012, 2018
UEFA Champions League runner-up: 2013–14, 2015–16

Spain U17
FIFA U-17 World Cup third place: 2009

Spain U19
UEFA European Under-19 Championship runner-up: 2010

Spain U21
UEFA European Under-21 Championship: 2013

Spain
UEFA Nations League runner-up: 2020–21

Individual
La Liga Squad of the Season: 2013–14
UEFA Champions League Squad of the Season: 2015–16
La Liga Player of the Month: October 2013, April 2016
UEFA European Under-21 Championship Team of the Tournament: 2013
UEFA Europa League Squad of the Season: 2017–18

References

External links

Atlético Madrid official profile

1992 births
Living people
Footballers from Madrid
Spanish footballers
Association football midfielders
La Liga players
Segunda División B players
Atlético Madrid B players
Atlético Madrid footballers
UEFA Europa League winning players
Spain youth international footballers
Spain under-21 international footballers
Spain under-23 international footballers
Olympic footballers of Spain
Spain international footballers
Footballers at the 2012 Summer Olympics
2014 FIFA World Cup players
UEFA Euro 2016 players
2018 FIFA World Cup players
UEFA Euro 2020 players
2022 FIFA World Cup players